The 1997 Labatt Brier was held from March 8 to 15 at the Canadian Airlines Saddledome in Calgary, Alberta. Kevin Martin of Alberta defeated Vic Peters of Manitoba in the final in front of a sell-out crowd of 17,024. It was the largest one-day attendance at any curling event in history up to that point and the Brier's total attendance of 223,322 was a record. In the tenth end of the final, Alberta led 9–8, without hammer. Team Martin played for the steal, throwing up numerous guards. On his last stone, Peters missed a six-foot angle raise double takeout, giving Alberta the steal, and losing the game. It was the first Brier Alberta won on home ice since 1961. The win qualified the Martin rink to represent Canada at the 1997 World Men's Curling Championship as well as a spot in the 1997 Canadian Olympic Curling Trials.

Teams

Round-robin standings

Round-robin results

Draw 1

Draw 2

Draw 3

Draw 4

Draw 5

Draw 6

Draw 7

Draw 8

Draw 9

Draw 10

Draw 11

Draw 12

Draw 13

Draw 14

Draw 15

Draw 16

Draw 17

Playoffs

3 vs. 4

1 vs. 2

Semifinal

Final

Statistics

Top 5 player percentages
Round Robin only

Team percentages
Round Robin only

References

 Archived statistics

The Brier
Curling competitions in Calgary
Labatt Brier
1997 in Alberta
March 1997 sports events in Canada